Down Under is an Australian feature-length film directed by Harry Southwell. It was the first full-length feature film made in Western Australia. It featured the outback, as well as Perth and Kings Park.

Plot
An Australian vagabond, Walter Nobbage, has a series of adventures, including a trotting race meeting, a cattle muster and an aboriginal corroboree. Nobbage's sweetheart dies and he sacrifices his life for the safe her his dead sweetheart's little boy.

Cast
Harry Southwell
Nancy Mills
Ivy Deakin
Alec Weird
Mrs Compton
L Laurence
J Austin
G Cotter
G Temple-Poole
J Hennessy
D Brown
J Southwell
A Raven

Production
The film was financed by West Australian businessmen and shot in that state at Erlistoun Station, Laverton and Perth.

Southwell claimed at the time he had a contract to make six films for distribution in Britain.

It was the first and only production of Anglo-Australian Films.

Release
It premiered on 4 September 1929 in Perth at the Majestic Theatre. The film appears never to have received a commercial release in Britain

Southwell attempted to set up another company in Australia, Western Southwell Productions, aiming to make a £4,000 movie called Gold. This film was never made.

References

External links
 
Down Under at National Film and Sound Archive

1927 films
Australian black-and-white films
Australian silent feature films
Films directed by Harry Southwell